The Best of Charley Pride is the first compilation album by American country music artist Charley Pride. It was released on the RCA Victor label (catalog no. LSP-4223). It debuted on Billboard magazine's country album chart on November 1, 1969, peaked at No. 1, and remained on the chart for 84 weeks.

It ranked third in sales among all albums released by Pride during his career, trailing only The Best of Charley Pride, Volume II and Charley Pride Sings Heart Songs.

Track listing

Charts

Weekly charts

Year-end charts

References

1969 albums
Charley Pride albums
RCA Records albums